Man with a Movie Camera is an ambient soundtrack by Biosphere for Dziga Vertov's 1929 film Man with a Movie Camera, commissioned by the Tromsø International Film Festival in 1996. This soundtrack was released later in 2001 as a bonus disc of Substrata 2 with two bonus tracks ("The Eye of the Cyclone" and "Endurium") from the Japanese version of Substrata.

Track listing

The original soundtrack
 "Prologue" – 0:19
 "The Silent Orchestra" – 7:52
 "City Wakes Up" – 5:58
 "Freeze-Frames" – 6:46
 "Manicure" – 4:43
 "The Club" – 1:57
 "Ballerina" – 7:50

As Substrata² bonus disc / digital reissue
 "Prologue" – 0:19
 "The Silent Orchestra" – 7:52
 "City Wakes Up" – 5:58
 "Freeze-Frames" – 6:46
 "Manicure" – 4:43
 "The Club" – 1:57
 "Ballerina" – 7:50
 "The Eye of the Cyclone"* – 7:22
 "Endurium"* – 10:47

(* bonus tracks, appear on the second CD in the 2001 Substrata² release and the 2006 digital reissue, but are originally featured as Japanese-only bonus tracks from the original Substrata 1997 Japanese release.)

References

External links

Man with a Movie Camera (alternative soundtracks) on Discogs

2001 albums
Biosphere (musician) albums
Touch Music albums